Miles Ogborn is a human geographer at Queen Mary, University of London.

Honors
In 2012 Ogborn was elected as a Fellow of the British Academy. In 2009, Professor Miles Ogborn was selected as a Distinguished Historical Geographer by the Historical Geography Specialty Group of the AAG. With this award, he was also given the opportunity to give a lecture at the Las Vegas AAG which was published in the journal Historical Geography. He was awarded the Philip Leverhulme Prize in 2001 for outstanding contribution to his discipline.

Works
Miles Ogborn has the following research and works:
Spaces of Modernity (1998)
Indian Ink (2007)
Father of Eef (2007)
Global Lives (2008)
The Freedom of Speech (2019)

References

See also
Lampeter Geography School

British geographers
Academics of Queen Mary University of London
Living people
Fellows of the British Academy
Historical geographers
Year of birth missing (living people)